The Adam Tree is a giant sequoia located in Mountain Home Grove, a sequoia grove in Giant Sequoia National Monument in the Sierra Nevada of California. It is the 21st largest giant sequoia in the world, and could be considered the 20th largest depending on how badly Ishi Giant atrophied during the Rough Fire in 2015.

Description
The Adam tree was named around 1884 by Jesse Hoskins, who was also responsible for the room cut out of the Hercules tree, which is also in the Mountain Home Grove. It was considered the largest tree in the grove until 1985, when Flint, with the help of photographer Mike Law, measured and named the nearby Genesis tree and demonstrated that it was larger. Three trees in the grove - the Genesis, Summit Road and Euclid trees - are presently considered to be larger than the Adam tree.

Dimensions
The dimensions of the Adam Tree as measured by Wendell D. Flint. The calculated volume ignores burns.

See also
 List of largest giant sequoias
 List of individual trees
 Mountain Home Grove

References

Further reading
 

Individual giant sequoia trees
Giant Sequoia National Monument
Natural history of Tulare County, California